WorldDAB is a global industry non-profit organisation responsible for defining the standards of the Eureka-147 family, which includes the DAB (Digital Audio Broadcasting) and DAB+ standards of digital radio. WorldDAB oversees the DAB/DAB+ standard, ensuring compatibility between broadcast and receiver equipment; supervising upgrades, and future proofing the technology. WorldDAB is based in Geneva with headquarters in London,.

The membership consists of over 80 companies and organisations around the world. They include public and private broadcasters, receiver and electronic equipment manufacturers, car manufacturers, data providers, transmission providers, regulators and government bodies.

Countries represented
 Australia
 Belgium
 Brunei
 Canada
 China
 Czech Republic
 Denmark
 France
 Germany
 Gibraltar
 Hong Kong
 Ireland
 Hungary
 Israel
 Italy
 Japan
 Malaysia
 Malta
 Monaco
 Netherlands
 New Zealand
 Norway
 Poland
 Romania
 Singapore
 South Africa
 South Korea
 Spain
 Switzerland
 Taiwan
 UK
 USA

References

External links
 WorldDAB Website
 WorldDAB Eureka! online industry magazine
 http://telematicsnews.info/2014/09/16/infographic-worlddab-shows-progress-for-digital-radio_s5161/

Digital radio
International organisations based in London
Organisations based in the London Borough of Camden
Radio organizations